Boonsak Ponsana (born 22 February 1982) is a Thai badminton player. His younger sister Salakjit Ponsana is also part of the Thailand badminton team. He got a Bachelor of Laws from Sri Patum.

Career 
Ponsana competed at the 2000 Summer Olympics, but was defeated in the round of 64. At the 2004 Summer Olympics, he was defeating Chris Dednam of South Africa and Lee Hyun-il of South Korea in the first two rounds.  In the quarterfinals, Ponsana defeated Ronald Susilo of Singapore 15–10, 15–1.  He advanced to the semifinals, in which he lost to Taufik Hidayat of Indonesia 15–9, 15–2.  Playing in the bronze medal match, he again lost to an Indonesian, this time Soni Dwi Kuncoro by a score of 15–11, 17-16 for a fourth-place finish. At the 2008 Summer Olympics, he reached the second round of the men's singles, where he lost 2 – 0 to Indonesia's Sony Dwi Kuncoro.

In 2007, he won the gold medals at the Summer Universiade in the men's singles and mixed team event. He also won some international tournament in 2004 Thailand Open, 2007 Singapore Open, and in 2008 India Open. He competed in 2009 Superseries Finals but he did not qualify for the semi-finals.   He played for Thailand in 2009 SEA Games in Laos, helping to win a bronze medal for Thailand in men's team. In 2012, he repeated his successful run at the Singapore Open Super Series beating Wang Zhengming of China in a thrilling two set match. Prior to his participation in the 2012 Singapore Open, injury had caused him to skip some tournaments in 2011, and his earlier 2012 results had not been especially good, although he did qualify for the Olympics again. In 2013, Boonsak has changed his speciality to men's doubles and he is now teaming with Songphon Anugritayawon.

Achievements

World Cup 
Men's singles

Asian Championships 
Men's singles

Southeast Asian Games 
Men's singles

Summer Universiade 
Men's singles

World Senior Championships 
Men's singles

Men's doubles

BWF Superseries  
The BWF Superseries, which was launched on 14 December 2006 and implemented in 2007, was a series of elite badminton tournaments, sanctioned by the Badminton World Federation (BWF). BWF Superseries levels were Superseries and Superseries Premier. A season of Superseries consisted of twelve tournaments around the world that had been introduced since 2011. Successful players were invited to the Superseries Finals, which were held at the end of each year.

Men's singles

 BWF Superseries Finals tournament
 BWF Superseries Premier tournament
 BWF Superseries tournament

BWF Grand Prix 
The BWF Grand Prix had two levels, the Grand Prix and Grand Prix Gold. It was a series of badminton tournaments sanctioned by the Badminton World Federation (BWF) and played between 2007 and 2017. The World Badminton Grand Prix was sanctioned by the International Badminton Federation from 1983 to 2006.

Men's singles

 BWF Grand Prix Gold tournament
 BWF & IBF Grand Prix tournament

IBF International 
Men's singles

Record against selected opponents
Includes results from all competitions 2001–present against Super Series finalists, World Championship semifinalists and Olympic quarterfinalists.

  Lin Dan 1–11
  Xia Xuanze 1–0
  Chen Jin 5–4
  Bao Chunlai 1–6
  Chen Hong 2–4
  Chen Long 2–9
  Du Pengyu 2–4
  Chen Yu 2–2
  Jan Ø. Jørgensen 2–10
  Peter Gade 3–3
  Viktor Axelsen 1–1
  Kevin Cordón 1–0
  Parupalli Kashyap 1–4
  Taufik Hidayat 1–9
  Sony Dwi Kuncoro 4–5
  Hendrawan 0–1
  Tommy Sugiarto 2–5
  Sho Sasaki 7–3
  Lee Hyun-il 5–5
  Shon Seung-mo 1–4
  Park Sung-hwan 1–4
  Son Wan-ho 1–1
  Wong Choong Hann 4–3
  Lee Chong Wei 2–24
  Liew Daren 2–2
  Ronald Susilo 7–2

See also 
 List of athletes with the most appearances at Olympic Games

References

External links

 
 
 

1982 births
Living people
Boonsak Ponsana
Boonsak Ponsana
Badminton players at the 2000 Summer Olympics
Badminton players at the 2004 Summer Olympics
Badminton players at the 2008 Summer Olympics
Badminton players at the 2012 Summer Olympics
Badminton players at the 2016 Summer Olympics
Boonsak Ponsana
Badminton players at the 1998 Asian Games
Badminton players at the 2002 Asian Games
Badminton players at the 2006 Asian Games
Badminton players at the 2010 Asian Games
Badminton players at the 2014 Asian Games
Boonsak Ponsana
Asian Games medalists in badminton
Medalists at the 2010 Asian Games
Competitors at the 1999 Southeast Asian Games
Competitors at the 2001 Southeast Asian Games
Competitors at the 2003 Southeast Asian Games
Competitors at the 2005 Southeast Asian Games
Competitors at the 2007 Southeast Asian Games
Competitors at the 2009 Southeast Asian Games
Competitors at the 2015 Southeast Asian Games
Boonsak Ponsana
Boonsak Ponsana
Southeast Asian Games medalists in badminton
Boonsak Ponsana
Universiade medalists in badminton
Badminton coaches
Medalists at the 2007 Summer Universiade